Finn Buster Robertson (born 13 September 1981) is an Australian front-end web developer. Previously a composer and music producer.

Before founding his independent front end development studio based in Melbourne, he grew up in country Victoria learning to play piano, guitar, and trumpet before discovering the bizarre and otherworldly sounds that were possible to make with a computer. From 2000 to 2002 he applied and expanded these skills from his early experiments in electronic and acoustic composition at RMIT University's Media Arts under Philip Brophy and Philip Samartzis. His works are notable for integrating electronic music sounds with traditional orchestral arrangements.

Career 

Finn worked in-house as Audio Director and Lead Composer for three years at Torus Games in Melbourne over which time he created the soundtracks and oversaw the Sound Design of over 10 commercially released games including 
 Scooby-Doo! and the Spooky Swamp for Warner Bros. Interactive Entertainment
 Scooby-Doo! First Frights for Warner Bros. Interactive Entertainment
 Zoo Hospital Wii for Majesco Entertainment
 Monster Jam: Urban Assault for Activision
 Monster Jam for Activision
 Shrek Smash n' Crash Racing for Activision
 Spider-Man: Battle for New York for Activision

Since then he has worked as a freelance Composer and Sound Designer on various short film animation and game projects including Pinion which was screened at the Melbourne International Film Festival in 2010 and Beatrice, her beast and the man from the city. Finn created sound design for Isobel Knowles' animation I Fell off my Bike and Jemila MacEwan's exhibition Drawing No. 1''

References

External links 

 
 

Australian film score composers
Male film score composers
Musicians from Melbourne
1981 births
Living people